The High Down Rocket Test Site is a former Rocket Testing facility on High Down near The Needles.

The site was built and operated in secret, from the 1950s. The Black Arrow rocket, used to launch the Prospero satellite (a wholly British project), was tested at the site. Black Knight was also tested there.

The development of rocketry was a part of the Cold War, in particular the development of Black Knight.

The site is now under the ownership of the National Trust, who also own the neighbouring Needles Battery.

References

External links
 
 
 

Isle of Wight
Cold War military equipment of the United Kingdom